Robert Westenberg (born October 26, 1953) is an American stage actor, acting teacher and professor. He appeared on Broadway in Sunday in the Park with George, Les Misérables, Into the Woods, and The Secret Garden, as well as several other musicals. He is the musical theatre coordinator and associate professor in the theatre and dance department at Missouri State University.

Early life and education
Born in Miami Beach, Florida, but raised in Fresno, California with his six siblings. Westenberg graduated Bullard High School in 1971, where he was active in sports, specifically football. He then attended California State University, Fresno.

Westenberg received a master's degree from Denver’s National Theatre Conservatory.

Career

Broadway
He made his Broadway debut in the 1983 revival of Zorba as Nikos, for which he won the Theatre World Award. 

He played the dual role of a Soldier/Alex and understudied Mandy Patinkin in Stephen Sondheim's Sunday in the Park with George in May 1984. He later took over Patinkin's leading roles of Georges Seurat/George where he played opposite Bernadette Peters in September of that year. 

He received a Tony Award nomination and won a Drama Desk Award for his performance as Cinderella's Prince and the Wolf in Sondheim's Into the Woods (1987). It was during this show where he met his wife, Kim Crosby, who played Cinderella.

In 1990, he starred as Inspector Javert in Les Misérables opposite Craig Schulman as Jean Valjean.

In 1991, he starred with Patinkin again along with Daisy Eagan, Alison Fraser and Rebecca Luker as Dr. Neville Craven in the original Broadway production of The Secret Garden. In 2020, Westenberg directed the same production at Missouri State University, where he is head of the Musical Theatre department.

Other

In 1981, Westenberg played Norman Mushari in Kurt Vonnegut’s God Bless You, Mr. Rosewater at Arena Stage.

In 1994 and 2001, Westenberg starred as Scrooge’s nephew Fred in the musical adaptation of A Christmas Carol in Madison Square Garden. 

In 1996, Westenberg was in the US National tour of Funny Girl as Nick Arnstein opposite Debbie Gibson as Fanny Brice. It ended prematurely in November 1996 in Green Bay, Wisconsin.

In 2002, Westenberg was in the US and Japan tour of The Full Monty. 

Westenberg has been in several MUNY (St. Louis) productions. He played Henry Higgins in My Fair Lady in 2001 opposite his wife, Kim Crosby, as Eliza Doolittle.

He played the roles of both Mr. Darling and Captain Hook in the July 2007 St. Louis MUNY production of Peter Pan. He reprised these roles in a 2009 production in Branson, Missouri, with Cathy Rigby as Peter Pan. In 2012, he directed a production of Les Misérables at Springfield Little Theatre.

Television and film
Westenberg's film credits include Mr. and Mrs. Bridge and The Ice Storm. He has made guest appearances on Third Watch, Law & Order: Special Victims Unit, and the short-lived series Aliens in the Family. He played Prince Raymond on the soap opera, One Life to Live from 1989-90.

He reprised his roles of a Soldier/Alex and the Wolf/Cinderella’s Prince in the American Playhouse episodes of Sunday in the Park with George and Into the Woods.

Stage credits

Filmography

Film

Television

Personal life 
He married actress and singer Kim Crosby on June 19, 1991, and the couple now have three children.

Westenberg lives with his wife, daughters Emily and Katherine, and son Joe in Springfield, Missouri, where he is  musical theatre coordinator and associate professor in the theatre and dance department at Missouri State University. He was previously 
chair of the theatre program at Drury University.

References

External links
 
 

American male musical theatre actors
American male film actors
American male television actors
People from Miami Beach, Florida
Drama Desk Award winners
Male actors from Miami
Missouri State University faculty
1953 births
Living people
People from Fresno, California